Critter Round-Up (Saku Saku Animal Panic in Japan) is a puzzle video game developed by Epicenter Studios and Konami for the Wii. It was released as a WiiWare launch title in Japan on March 25, 2008, North America on May 19, 2008 and in Europe on August 29, 2008. It costs 1,000 Wii Points.

Gameplay
The player controls a farmer who must build fences to contain several animals. Players must separate species from each other while avoiding running into them and keeping them away from predators. Occasionally, a present will drop from the sky which, if collected, gives the player a power-up such as food to attract the animals or a spray to repel them. Elements of the gameplay resemble that of the arcade game Qix.

The main Adventure Mode features 50 levels across five different environments, each with their own species. In addition, Critter Round-Up also features a Marathon mode with infinite levels and support for up to four players, as well as minigames such as Snowball Soccer and Predator Rampage.

Reception
Critter Round-Up received generally average to above average reviews.

Wii Fanboy gave it 7.5/10, believing that the gameplay was "fun and addicting" and "loaded with a surprising amount of depth." CheatCodeCentral also gave the game a respectable 3.9/5 (78%), seeing "high replay value" and noting it to be "highly enjoyable in brief sessions in solo or multiplayer modes". GameSpot gave it a 7/10, praising the co-op mode and calling it "a good choice for light puzzle action and wacky multiplayer fun", but noting that, with the game aimed towards a younger audience, "folks looking for a mature puzzler are advised to look elsewhere".

However, IGN gave it 6.1 out of 10, believing that while the game has its charms and might be "fascinating" for younger players, the gameplay becomes much less engaging after extended play and that the minigames were "forgettable". 1UP.com, which gave it a C grade, also claimed the minigames were "uniformly uninteresting" and the single player was a "one note" experience, but thought the co-op mode livened up the game. They also had trouble deciding if the cel-shaded graphics were a distinct style or just "sloppy and unrefined".

References

External links
Japanese Animal Panic WiiWare page

2008 video games
Konami games
Multiplayer and single-player video games
Puzzle video games
Video games about animals
Video games developed in the United States
Wii games
Wii-only games
WiiWare games